Nancy Holder (born August 29, 1953) is an American writer and the author of several novels, including numerous tie-in books based on the TV series Buffy the Vampire Slayer.  She's also written fiction related to several other science fiction and fantasy shows, including Angel and Smallville.

Personal life and education 
Holder was born Nancy Lindsay Jones in Los Altos, California on August 29, 1953. Growing up in California and Japan, Nancy quit school at 16 to be a ballet dancer in Germany. Eventually returning to the U.S., she resumed her studies and graduated from the University of California at San Diego with a Communications degree. 

Holder is married to Wayne Holder, with whom she has a daughter, Belle Claire Christine Holder (born October 28, 1996).

Career 
Holder is a four-time winner of the Bram Stoker Award for superior achievement in horror writing. She won Best Short Story in 1991 for "Lady Madonna," in 1993 for "I Hear the Mermaids Singing," and in 1994 for "Cafe Endless: Spring Rain." She won Best Novel in 1994 for Dead in the Water. Other books by Nancy Holder (and Debbie Viguié) include the "Wicked" series, about a family feud between a coven of witches called the Cahors and a coven of warlocks called the Devereux.

Holder contributed to the design of Dungeon Master, developed and sold by her husband Wayne Holder's company FTL Games. She has also begun collaborating with her daughter, Claire Holder, when published short stories.

Holder contributed the original story concept to the 2018 Firefly novel Big Damn Hero by James Lovegrove.

She occasionally teaches courses in writing and on Buffy the Vampire Slayer at  the University of California at San Diego.

In 2014, Holder stepped into the position of Vice President of the Horror Writers Association.

Awards

Bibliography

Novels
 Jessie's Song (1983) (writing as Nancy L. Jones)
 Winner Take All (1984)
 The Greatest Show on Earth (1984)
 Finders Keepers (1985)
 His Fair Lady (1985)
 Out of This World (1985)
 Once in Love with Amy (1986)
 Emerald Fire (1986)
 Rough Cut (1990)
 The Ghosts of Tivoli (1992)
 Cannibal Dwight's Special Purpose (1992)
 Making Love (1993) (with Melanie Tem)
 Dead in the Water (1994 Dell Publishing) – 
 Witch-Light (1996) (with Melanie Tem)
 Pearl Harbor, 1941 (2000)
 Smallville: Hauntings (2003) 
 Spirited (2004)
 Pretty Little Devils (2006)
 Daughter of the Flames (2006)
 Daughter of the Blood (2006)
 The Rose Bride (2007)
 On Fire a Teen Wolf novel (2012)
 Crimson Peak (2015)
 Ghostbusters (2016 Tor Books) – 
 Wonder Woman (2017 Titan Books) – 

Collections
 Wings and Other Poems (poems) (1972)

Series
Gambler's Star
 The Six Families (1998)
 Legacies and Lies (1999)
 Invasions (2000)
 
Wicked
 Witch (2002) (with Debbie Viguié)
 Curse (2002) (with Debbie Viguié)
 Legacy (2003) (with Debbie Viguié)
 Spellbound (2003) (with Debbie Viguié)
 Resurrection (2009) (with Debbie Viguié)
 
RSVP
 Camp Confidential (2005) (as Melissa J. Morgan)

Possessions
 Possessions (2009)
 The Evil Within (2010)
 The Screaming Season (Mar 2011)

Crusade
 Crusade (2010) (with Debbie Viguié)
 Damned (2011) (with Debbie Viguié)
 Vanquished (2012) (with Debbie Viguié)

Wolf Springs Chronicles
 Unleashed (2011) (with Debbie Viguié)
 Hot Blooded (July 9, 2012) (with Debbie Viguié)
 Savage (2013) (with Debbie Viguié)

Buffyverse works

Novels
1997: Halloween Rain (with Christopher Golden)
1998: Blooded (with Christopher Golden)
1998: Child of the Hunt (with Christopher Golden)
1998: The Angel Chronicles, Vol. 1 
1999: The Gatekeeper trilogy (with Christopher Golden)
1999: Immortal (with Christopher Golden)
1999: The Angel Chronicles, Vol. 31999: The Sunnydale High Yearbook2000: The Evil That Men Do2000: Not Forgotten2000: Unseen (with Jeff Mariotte)
2001: The Book of Fours2002: The Journals of Rupert Giles, Vol. 12002: Endangered Species2003: Blood and Fog2004: Heat2005: Keep Me in Mind2005: Queen of the Slayers2006: Carnival of SoulsShort stories
She has also written short stories in:How I Survived My Summer Vacation (2000)Tales of the Slayer (2001)The Longest Night (2002)
Non-Buffyverse:Tales of ZorroThe Eternal Kiss: 13 Vampire Tales of Blood and Desire (with Debbie Viguié)Furry Fantastic (with Belle Holder) Pandora's Closet (with Belle Holder)

 Anthologies 

 Non-fiction Angel: the Casefiles, Volume 1 (with Jeff Mariotte and Maryelizabeth Hart) (1999)Buffy the Vampire Slayer Encyclopedia: The Ultimate Guide to the Buffyverse (2017)

 Comics 
Beginning in 2009 she has contributed a number of stories for the Domino Lady comics published by Moonstone Books.

See also
Buffyverse chronology
List of Buffy the Vampire Slayer books – these tend to surround the character of Buffy and the fictional town of Sunnydale
List of Angel books – these instead focus on Angel and his so-called "Fang Gang"Tales of the Slayer – these chronicle the stories of past slayers in the Buffy'' canon

References

External links

Nancy Holder bibliography at FantasticFiction
Nancy Holder at SciFiPedia

20th-century American novelists
21st-century American novelists
20th-century American women writers
21st-century American women writers
American women novelists
American science fiction writers
American horror writers
Living people
1953 births
People from Los Altos, California
Women science fiction and fantasy writers
Women horror writers
Novelists from California
University of California, San Diego alumni
University of California, San Diego faculty